Enterprise is an extinct town in McDonald County, in the U.S. state of Missouri.

A post office called Enterprise was established in 1850, and remained in operation until 1875. The community declined sometime after the Civil War.

References

Ghost towns in Missouri
Former populated places in McDonald County, Missouri